Shamshi-ilu (Šamši-ilu) was an influential court dignitary and commander in chief (turtanu) of the Assyrian army who rose in high prominence.

He was active during the reigns of Assyrian kings Adad-nirari III (810–782 BC), Shalmaneser IV (782–772 BC), Ashur-dan III (771–754 BC) and Ashur-nirari V (754–746 BC). Three times, in 780, 770 and 752 BC, he held the office of limmu officials. He resided at Til Barsip, which is now in northern Syria, and where there are many inscriptions mentioning him.

Origins

Shamshi-ilu probably was not born in Assyria, though he was from noble lineage of the Bit-Adini tribe and was more than likely educated at the Assyrian court. Later, he rose in the ranks of the Assyrian army to become the commander in chief (turtanu) who had a high degree of influence over the kings of Assyria who lived in his time. He was probably made governor when Shalmaneser III annexed the territories of the Bit-Adini.

Some scholars suggested that he might have been of royal Assyrian birth. Wolfram von Soden believed that he might have been a younger son of Adad-narari III. A gold bowl with an inscription of Samsi-ilu had been discovered in the grave of queen Mullissu-mukannishat-Ninua, so this may indicate that he had some connection with the royal family.

Turtanu

Rising in high order through the ranks thanks to his teachings in the Assyrian ways Shamshi-ilu rose to the highest position in the army under the Kings Adad-Nirari III and Shalmaneser IV.

According to the Antakya stele inscription of Adad-nirari III dating around 800 BC, Shamshi-ilu mediated in the border dispute between the kingdoms of Hamath and Arpad. At that time, around 796 BC, due to the weakness of the royal power, and the young age of the king, Shamshi-ilu probably became a gray eminence at the Assyrian court, managing the affairs of the state.

He also could have been around much later, possibly coming into contact with Pulu (Tiglath-Pileser III) at some point. He may possibly have taken part in the rebellion that saw Tiglath-pileser III take the throne from Ashur-nirari V, although he may have been dead at this point.

According to Grayson,

"In his own inscriptions he [Shamshi-ilu] has a grandiose list of titles: "field marshal, great herald, administrator of temples, chief of the extensive army, governor of the lands Hatti, Guti, and Namri (Hurrian region around Tigris river)". That is, he claims to have governed the lands stretching all the way from central Anatolia, through Armenia, Kurdistan, as far as the East Tigris region around the Diyala River."

Campaigns

Shamshi-ilu's most famous and well documented campaign was against the Urartu king Argishti I in 780 BCE. His name appeared on many public monuments such as the colossal stone lion which accounts for his victories on this campaign. He is also known to have transferred land and border agreements with the Syro-Hittites, which are recorded on a stone stele. He quite possibly could have been the prime leader in the Damascus campaign in 796 BCE.

The information about Shamshi-ilu ends at the end of the reign of Ashur-nirari V, when Assyria was swept by a wave of revolts and riots, which in 745 BC succeeded Tiglath-pileser III (745–727 BC).

See also
Zakkur

References

Bibliography 
 
 
 

Ancient Assyrians
8th-century BC people